Crush on You may refer to:
 Crush on You (album), a 2014 album by Crush
 "Crush on You" (The Jets song), 1985, covered by Aaron Carter in 1997
 "Crush on You" (Lil' Kim song), 1996
 "Crush on You" (Nero song), 2011
 "Crush on You", a 1980 song by Bruce Springsteen from the album The River
 "Crush on You", a 2013 song by Crush
 "Crush on You", a 2016 song by The Legend from the album Sound Up
 "Crush on You", a 2016 song by Babylon from the album Fantasy

See also
 A Crush on You, a 2011 television film
 "I've Got a Crush on You", a 1928 George and Ira Gershwin song
 "Crush" (Mandy Moore song), a 2001 song with the refrain, "I got a crush on you"